In mathematics, the Kurosh problem is one general problem, and several more special questions, in ring theory. The general problem is known to have a negative solution, since one of the special cases has been shown to have counterexamples. These matters were brought up by Aleksandr Gennadievich Kurosh as analogues of the Burnside problem in group theory.

Kurosh asked whether there can be a finitely-generated infinite-dimensional algebraic algebra (the problem being to show this cannot happen). A special case is whether or not every nil algebra is locally nilpotent.
For PI-algebras the Kurosh problem has a positive solution.

Golod showed a counterexample to that case, as an application of the Golod–Shafarevich theorem.

The Kurosh problem on group algebras concerns the augmentation ideal I. If I is a nil ideal, is the group algebra locally nilpotent?

There is an important problem which is often referred as the Kurosh's problem on division rings. The problem asks whether there exists an algebraic (over the center) division ring which is not locally finite. This problem has not been solved until now.

References
Vesselin S. Drensky, Edward Formanek (2004), Polynomial Identity Rings, p. 89.
Some open problems in the theory of infinite dimensional algebras (2007). E. Zelmanov.

Ring theory
Unsolved problems in mathematics